Lycaethus (Ancient Greek: Λύκαιθος) is a name that refers to the following figures in Greek mythology:

Lycaethus, father of Creon, king of Corinth, father of Glauce and Hippotes.
Lycaethus, a son of King Hippocoon of Sparta, usurper of Tyndareus. He was the brother of  Lycon, Alcinous, Dorycleus, Scaeus, Enarophorus, Eurytus, Bucolus, Euteiches, Hippothous, Tebrus, Hippocorystes, Alcimus, Dorceus, Sebrus, Eumedes, Enaesimus, Alcon and Leucippus.
Lycaethus, one of the Suitors of Penelope who came from Same along with other 22 wooers. He, with the other suitors, was slain by Odysseus with the aid of Eumaeus, Philoetius, and Telemachus.

Notes

References 

 Apollodorus, The Library with an English Translation by Sir James George Frazer, F.B.A., F.R.S. in 2 Volumes, Cambridge, MA, Harvard University Press; London, William Heinemann Ltd. 1921. ISBN 0-674-99135-4. Online version at the Perseus Digital Library. Greek text available from the same website.
Gaius Julius Hyginus, Fabulae from The Myths of Hyginus translated and edited by Mary Grant. University of Kansas Publications in Humanistic Studies. Online version at the Topos Text Project.
 Pausanias, Description of Greece with an English Translation by W.H.S. Jones, Litt.D., and H.A. Ormerod, M.A., in 4 Volumes. Cambridge, MA, Harvard University Press; London, William Heinemann Ltd. 1918. . Online version at the Perseus Digital Library
Pausanias, Graeciae Descriptio. 3 vols. Leipzig, Teubner. 1903.  Greek text available at the Perseus Digital Library.

Princes in Greek mythology
Suitors of Penelope
Corinthian characters in Greek mythology